Sport1 may refer to the following TV channels:

 Sport1 (Eastern Europe)
 Sport1 (Germany)
 Sport1 (Lithuania)
 Sport1 (Netherlands), now Ziggo Sport Totaal
 Sport 1 (Russian TV channel), now Match! Arena